This is the discography of American rapper Plies.

Albums

Studio albums

Compilation albums

EPs

Mixtapes

Singles

As lead artist

As featured artist

Promotional singles

Guest appearances

References

Discographies of American artists
Hip hop discographies